The Dominican Republic women's national football team represents the Dominican Republic in international women's football. The team is governed by the Dominican Football Federation and competes in CONCACAF (the Confederation of North, Central American, and Caribbean Association Football) women's competitions.

History

The beginning
The Dominican team played its first international match in 2002 against Saint Lucia as a part of the CFU qualifying tournament for the 2002 CONCACAF Women's Gold Cup. in which the Dominican Republic draw Saint Lucia 2–2. on matchday two the team faced the Bahamian Team achieving their first-ever win with a score of three to nil. they lost their last game to Haiti conceding two goals to end third after Saint Lucia surpass them on superior goal difference. one year after, the team entered the CONCACAF Women's Pre-Olympic Tournament qualification for the first time with the Dominican republic hosting Haiti for two-legged matches in the Estadio Panamericano. in which it suffered a 2–10 aggregate defeat against the inaugural CFU women's Caribbean Cup Champions Haiti. after the first match's seven-nil loss, the Dominicans fought well in their second-leg game losing 2–3 in a match where they lead the halftime 2–1.

Improvement
the 2006 CONCACAF Women's Gold Cup Qualifying marked an improvement as the Dominican Republic topped the first round Group A undefeated, advancing to the second round they been drawn together with the Host Trinidad and Tobago and Suriname. Los Quisqueyanos kicked their second round with a two-nil win against Suriname. losing to the Tobagonian team to end second after Trinidad and Tobago, which qualified for the final tournament.
the 2008 CONCACAF Women's Olympic Qualifying Tournament qualification saw a better performance from the team. as they won their first game four to nil against the U.S. Virgin Islands, their second match was a historical moment for the women's football in the Dominican Republic, as the National team trashed the British Virgin Islands by a scoreline never before seen in the entire CONCACAF region for international football. The margin of 17 clear goals, while keeping a clean sheet, is unrivaled in football in the history of the game across the CONCACAF region in all international competitions. with their final and decisive match against Cuba. the team dominated the first half scoring the first goal however Cuba Managed to score the equalizer and a last-minute goal to eliminate the Dominicans.
2011 marked history for the Dominican team as they qualified for their first CONCACAF tournament (2012 CONCACAF Women's Olympic Qualifying Tournament) after finishing top of the group B undefeated beating Dominica, Bermuda and Trinidad and Tobago. qualifying for the first continental tournament, Dominican Republic was drawn with the world's most successful team the United States. Mexico and Cuba. the team opened its tournament with a 0–14	loss against the United States which is the biggest defeat the team has received in its history. losing the two other matches the Dominican Republic finished last.
in the last years, the Dominican team maintains a good performance, the team entered several tournaments including the 2014 Central American and Caribbean Games, CONCACAF Women's Olympic Qualifying Championships qualification, and CONCACAF W championship qualification finishing second.

Results and fixtures

The following is a list of match results in the last 12 months, as well as any future matches that have been scheduled.

Legend

2022

Dominican Republic Results and Fixtures – Soccerway.com

Coaching staff

Current coaching staff

Manager history

(If statistics are unavailable, display former coaches in bulleted list form)

Players

Current squad
The following players were called up for the match against Jamaica on 12 April 2022.

Recent call-ups
The following players have also been called up to the Dominican Republic squad within the last 12 months.

Records

*Players in bold are still active, at least at club level.

Most capped players

Top goalscorers

Competitive record

FIFA Women's World Cup

*Draws include knockout matches decided on penalty kicks.

Olympic Games

*Draws include knockout matches decided on penalty kicks.

CONCACAF W Championship

*Draws include knockout matches decided on penalty kicks.

Pan American Games

*Draws include knockout matches decided on penalty kicks.

Central American and Caribbean Games

*Draws include knockout matches decided on penalty kicks.

CFU Women's Caribbean Cup

*Draws include knockout matches decided on penalty kicks.

See also
Sport in the Dominican Republic
Football in the Dominican Republic
Women's football in the Dominican Republic
Dominican Republic women's national under-23 football team
Dominican Republic women's national under-20 football team
Dominican Republic women's national under-17 football team
Dominican Republic men's national football team

References

External links
Official website 
FIFA profile